Kennedy is an unincorporated community in Cherry County, Nebraska, United States.

History
A post office was established at Kennedy in 1886, and remained in operation until it was discontinued in 1969. The community was named for B. E. B. Kennedy of Omaha.

References

Populated places in Cherry County, Nebraska
Unincorporated communities in Nebraska